This was a new event in 2011 for the ITF Women's Circuit.

Elitsa Kostova and Barbara Sobaszkiewicz won the title, defeating Ani Mijačika and Ana Vrljić 1–6, 6–3, [12–10] in the final.

Seeds

Draw

External links
 Main draw

Zagreb Open - Doubles